Steve or Steven Ryan may refer to:

Sportsmen
 Steve Ryan (soccer) (born 1956), American soccer player
 Steve Ryan (American football), American football coach in the United States
 Steve Ryan, curler in the 2014 Newfoundland and Labrador Tankard

Others
 Steve Ryan (actor, born 1947) (1947–2007), American actor
 Steve Ryan (actor, born 1980) (born 1980), American actor
 Steve Ryan (author) (born 1949), American author
 Steve Ryan, candidate in the 1985 Ontario general election

See also
 Stephen Ryan (disambiguation)